Dammeri is a specific epithet that refers to Carl Lebrecht Udo Dammer. It is found in the following species names:
 Cotoneaster dammeri, a plant species
 Rhodospatha dammeri, a plant species endemic to Ecuador